This is the results breakdown of the local elections held in the Valencian Community on 22 May 2011. The following tables show detailed results in the autonomous community's most populous municipalities, sorted alphabetically.

Overall

City control
The following table lists party control in the most populous municipalities, including provincial capitals (shown in bold). Gains for a party are displayed with the cell's background shaded in that party's colour.

Municipalities

Alcoy
Population: 61,417

Alicante
Population: 334,418

Benidorm
Population: 71,198

Castellón de la Plana
Population: 180,690

Elche
Population: 230,822

Elda
Population: 54,815

Gandia
Population: 79,430

Orihuela
Population: 87,113

Paterna
Population: 65,921

Sagunto
Population: 66,259

Torrent
Population: 79,843

Torrevieja
Population: 101,091

Valencia

Population: 809,267

See also
2011 Valencian regional election

References

Valencian Community
2011